Daniel Cantillon (born February 17, 1945) is an American former fencer. He competed in the team épée event at the 1968 Summer Olympics.

References

External links
 

1945 births
Living people
American male épée fencers
Olympic fencers of the United States
Fencers at the 1968 Summer Olympics
Sportspeople from Cleveland
Pan American Games medalists in fencing
Pan American Games gold medalists for the United States
Fencers at the 1971 Pan American Games